According to Lucius Annaeus Cornutus' Compendium Theologiae Graecae, Eurydome  (Ευρυδόμη; "Structure Outside the Areas") was the mother of the Graces by Zeus (a role normally attributed to the similarly named Eurynome).

References
 Cornutus, Compendium Theologiae Graecae, 15

Greek goddesses
Divine women of Zeus